The Virginian is a 1946 American Western film directed by Stuart Gilmore and starring Joel McCrea, Brian Donlevy, Sonny Tufts, and Barbara Britton. Based on the 1902 Owen Wister novel of the same name, the film was adapted from the popular 1904 theatrical play Wister had collaborated on with playwright Kirke La Shelle. The Virginian is about an eastern school teacher who comes to Medicine Bow in Wyoming and encounters life on the frontier. The film is a remake of the 1929 movie with Gary Cooper and Walter Huston. There have been several versions of the story, beginning with a 1914 film directed by Cecil B. DeMille and including a 1960s television series that bore little relation to the book other than the title. The film was originally distributed by Paramount Pictures.

Plot
In 1885, Molly Wood (Barbara Britton) leaves the security (and dullness) of Vermont to be a schoolteacher in frontier Wyoming. On arrival, she becomes frightened by a spooked steer, and is "rescued" by the Virginian (Joel McCrea), only to discover the animal is so mild, it is a little girl's pet. As a result, she takes a strong dislike to the cowboy. He, on the other hand, is smitten with her. When Trampas (Brian Donlevy) voices his scurrilous speculation as to why she came west, the Virginian confronts him and forces him, at gunpoint, to take it back. 
 
Mr. and Mrs. Taylor (Henry O'Neill and Fay Bainter) put Molly up in their old home. The Virginian starts courting her, much against her will initially. Steve Andrews (Sonny Tufts), a friend the Virginian has not seen in three years, is also interested in her. Eventually, she warms to the Virginian, but her feelings for him are not as strong and certain as his are for her.

Meanwhile, families are being driven away by the depredations of cattle rustlers. The Virginian suspects Trampas is the ringleader, but has no proof. When he sees Steve becoming friendly to Trampas, he warns his easygoing friend to keep better company. When he catches Steve with one of Judge Henry's calves, applying Trampas's brand on the pretext of branding a "stray," the Virginian warns Steve to choose wisely what course he wants his life to take because he will not cover up any rustling activities.

Before setting out on a long cattle drive, the Virginian tells Molly she will have to decide by the time he returns whether they have a future together. On the trail, Trampas and his men start a stampede, using the distraction to steal a couple of hundred animals. Afterward, the Virginian fears that Steve has been killed, but he in fact is working with Trampas.

Judge Henry (an uncredited Minor Watson), whose cattle were taken, persuades the Virginian to lead a posse. When they find the rustlers, one is killed when he tries to draw his gun, and two others surrender. The Virginian catches Steve as he is sneaking away; Steve says no one would know if his friend were to let him go, but the Virginian takes him back to join the others. Trampas, however, gets away. The next day, the three rustlers are lynched.

When the Virginian goes after Trampas, he is shot in the back. Molly tends him during the months of recovery. However, when she learns that he had to hang his own friend, she decides to return east. Andy (an uncredited James Burke), the stagecoach driver, makes her see that she is in love with the Virginian. She finally agrees to marry the cowboy.

Just before their wedding, Trampas shows up to settle matters with the Virginian, telling him to leave town by sundown or else. Molly pleads with her fiancé to do just that, but the Virginian has no choice. He arms himself with the revolver Steve had left him, and the two men stalk each other. Trampas spots the Virginian first, and is about to ambush him, when he startles a horse. Warned, the Virginian manages to kill Trampas. The Virginian and Molly then ride off into the sunset.

Cast
 Joel McCrea as The Virginian
 Brian Donlevy as Trampas
 Sonny Tufts as Steve Andrews
 Barbara Britton as Molly Wood
 Fay Bainter as Mrs. Taylor
 Tom Tully as Nebraska
 Henry O'Neill as Mr. Taylor
 Bill Edwards as Sam Bennett
 William Frawley as Honey Wiggen
 Paul Guilfoyle as Shorty, one of the hanged rustlers
 Marc Lawrence as Pete
 Vince Barnett as Baldy

Production

Background
The basic plot elements of the film were inspired by the 1892 Johnson County War in Wyoming, the archetypal cattlemen-homesteaders conflict, which also served as the background for Shane and Heaven's Gate.

Filming locations
 Andy Jauregui Ranch, Placerita Canyon Road, Newhall, California, USA 
 Kernville, California, USA 
 Monogram Ranch, 24715 Oak Creek Avenue, Newhall, California, USA 
 Paramount Ranch, 2813 Cornell Road, Agoura, California, USA

References

External links

 Owen Wister Papers at the University of Wyoming – American Heritage Center
 Some manuscript pages of Owen Wister's 1902 book The Virginian are preserved at the American Heritage Center at the University of Wyoming.

1946 films
1946 Western (genre) films
Films based on American novels
Films based on Western (genre) novels
American films based on plays
Films set in Wyoming
Paramount Pictures films
Films based on adaptations
Films with screenplays by Howard Estabrook
Films scored by Daniele Amfitheatrof
American Western (genre) films
American black-and-white films
1940s English-language films
1940s American films